The 2020 National Games of India, also known as Goa 2020, were to have been held between 20 October and 4 November 2020 in Goa.

In May 2020, it was announced that games would be indefinitely postponed as a result of the global COVID-19 pandemic. They were ultimately cancelled with the next national games scheduled to be held between 27 September and 10 October 2022 in Gujarat.

Expected teams
Teams were expected from all 28 states and eight union territories of India as well a team representing Indian Armed Forces. The new union territories of Ladakh and Dadra and Nagar Haveli and Daman and Diu were expected to have made their National Games debut at these games.

Marketing
The official logo of the games and the mascot, Rubigula the Flame-Throated Bulbul, were unveiled in January 2020.

Venues

Venues that were to have been used during the 2020 National Games included:
GMC Athletic Stadium – athletics
Campal Swimming Pool – aquatics
Campal Indoor Complex – boxing, table tennis, wrestling
Dr Shyama Prasad Mukherjee Indoor Stadium – basketball, volleyball
Fatorda Stadium – opening and closing ceremonies
Miramar Beach – beach handball, beach volleyball
Peddem Indoor Stadium – badminton
Tilak Maidan Stadium – football

Sports
The games would have featured 37 sports as follows:

See also
 Khelo India Youth Games

References

External links 

 
 Goa 2020 on Facebook
 Goa 2020 on Twitter

National Games of India
National Games of India
National Games of India